Thomas Ridley (1799–1879) was a merchant and political figure in Newfoundland.

Thomas Ridley may also refer to:

Thomas H. Ridley (died 1904), merchant and political figure in Colony of Newfoundland
Thomas Ridley (cricketer) (1858–1945), English cricketer, barrister and clergyman
Thomas Ridley (MP), Member of Parliament (MP) for Much Wenlock
Thomas Ridley (MP died 1629), MP for Chipping Wycombe and Lymington
Thomas E. Ridley, namesake of Ridleys Ferry, California